Year 1172 (MCLXXII) was a leap year starting on Saturday (link will display the full calendar) of the Julian calendar.

Events 
 By place 

 Europe 
 April - May – Béla III returns to Hungary – where he is acclaimed king by the Hungarian nobility, after the death (possibly poison) of his elder brother Stephen III, on March 4. 
 May 28 – Doge Vitale II Michiel, accused at a General Assembly at the Ducal Palace, for the destruction of the Venetian fleet, is stabbed to death by an angry mob at Venice.
 Summer – The 14-year-old Richard (later Richard I of England) is formally recognized as duke of Aquitaine. The ceremony takes place in Poitiers, at the Church of St. Hilary.
 A Muslim rebellion is quelled at Prades in Catalonia; this event marks the end of the pacification of the lands recently conquered by Count Ramon Berenguer IV (the Saint).

 England 
 King Henry II and Humbert III (the Blessed), agree to wed their respective heirs, John and Alicia. The alliance never occurs because Henry's elder heir, Henry the Young King, becomes jealous over the castles in the realm which Henry has promised to the couple. He stages a rebellion which will take Henry two years to put down. By that time, Alicia has died.
 April 17 – Henry II receives homage from the Irish princes who include Domnall Mór Ua Briain, king of Munster. He grants Hugh de Lacy the lordship of Meath (or Mide) for providing the services of 50 knights.

 Egypt 
 Summer – Emir Nur al-Din begins a two year war against the Danishmends. He creates a buffer zone between the Syrian realm and Egypt. Meanwhile, he releases Count Raymond of Tripoli for the sum of 80,000 dinars.
 Winter – The Nubians are engaged in a series of skirmishes along the frontier in Upper Egypt. A force of  Kurdish troops under Turan-Shah, a brother of Saladin, attack the Nubians. He installs a garrison in Qasr Ibrim.

 By topic 

 Religion 
 May – Compromise of Avranches: Alberto di Morra is sent by Pope Alexander III to the Council of Avranches, to investigate the murder of Thomas Becket. Henry II is cleared of any guilt in Becket's murder. He swears to go on a crusade and does penance at the Cathedral of Avranches. He revokes two controversial clauses of the Constitutions of Clarendon.
 Autumn – The Synod of Cashel ends the Celtic Christian system and brings them into alignment with the Roman Rite (Catholic Church).
 According to the annals of the Worcester Priory, "nothing memorable" happens in this year.

Births 
 July 12 – Matsudono Moroie, Japanese nobleman (d. 1238)
 Al-Qifti, Egyptian historian and biographer (d. 1248)
 Az-Zahir Ghazi, Ayyubid ruler of Aleppo (d. 1216)
 Baldwin I, emperor of the Latin Empire (d. 1205)
 Conrad II, duke of Swabia and Rothenburg (d. 1196)
 Isabel de Clare, countess of Pembroke (d. 1220)
 Isabella I, queen and regent of Jerusalem (d. 1205)
 Louis I of Blois, French nobleman (d. 1205)

Deaths 
 March 4 – Stephen III, king of Hungary (b. 1147)
 March 7 – Il-Arslan, Khwarezm ruler (shah)
 May 28 – Vitale II Michiel, doge of Venice
 October 14 – Ludwig II, German nobleman (b. 1128)
 December 23 – Ugo Ventimiglia, Italian cardinal
 Douce II, countess of Provence (b. 1162)
 Cadwaladr ap Gruffydd, king of Gwynedd
 Hugh of Fouilloy, French prior and writer
 Ibn Qalaqis, Fatimid poet and writer (b. 1137)
 Robert FitzEdith, English nobleman (b. 1093)
 Robert FitzRanulph, English high sheriff 
 William III, French nobleman (b. 1093)
 William VII, French nobleman b. 1131)
 Henry, Prince of Capua, Sicilian prince (b. 1160)

References